Fodéba Keïta (January 19, 1921 in Siguiri – May 27, 1969 at Camp Boiro) was a Guinean dancer, musician, writer, playwright, composer and politician. Founder of the first professional African theatrical troupe, Theatre Africain, he also arranged Liberté, the national anthem of Guinea.

Early years
Keïta was the son of a male nurse. He received his early education at the École normale supérieure William Ponty.

Career
During his law studies in Paris in 1948, he founded the band Sud Jazz.  Beginning in the late 1940s, he founded Théâtre Africain (later Les Ballets Africains), a successful ballet group which toured Africa for six years and later became the national dance company of Guinea; then president of Senegal Léopold Sédar Senghor held it in high esteem.  With Kanté Facély and Les Ballets Africains, he became instrumental in showcasing previously unknown Mandé performance traditions to other continents as well.

After returning to Guinea, he published the poetry collection Poèmes africains (1950), the novel Le Maître d'école (1952), and in 1957, Keïta wrote and staged the narrative poem Aube africaine ("African Dawn") as a theatre-ballet based on the Thiaroye massacre. In African Dawn, a young man called Naman complies with the French colonial rulers by fighting in the French Army only to be killed in Thiaroye in Senegal, in a dispute between West-African soldiers and white officers. However, his works were banned in French Africa as he was considered radical and anticolonial.

Politically active in the African Democratic Rally, Keïta worked closely with Guinea's first president Sékou Touré from 1956, and in 1957 was elected to the Territorial Assembly. In 1961, Keïta was appointed minister for defense and security. He uncovered alleged plots against Sékou Touré, but was imprisoned in the infamous Camp Boiro, a prison he himself helped construct, for alleged complicity in the February 1969 Labé Plot, and was subjected to torture ("diète noire" – complete food and fluid withdrawal).

On May 27, 1969, he was shot dead without trial.

Gallery

References

Works cited
Iffono, Aly Gilbert: Lexique historique de la Guinée-Conakry, l'Harmattan, Paris, 1992.

External links
Obituary at the Camp Boiro memorial website

Guinean politicians
Guinean dancers
Guinean composers
Guinean dramatists and playwrights
Choreographers
People from Siguiri
1921 births
1969 deaths
People executed by Guinea by firearm
Executed Guinean people
Guinean poets
Guinean novelists
20th-century dramatists and playwrights
20th-century novelists
20th-century poets
20th-century composers
Male poets
Male novelists
Male dramatists and playwrights
Male composers
Guinean male writers
National anthem writers
20th-century male writers
Grand Crosses with Star and Sash of the Order of Merit of the Federal Republic of Germany
20th-century male musicians
Guinean expatriates in Senegal
Guinean expatriates in France